Sondekoppa Ramachandrasastri Ramaswamy is an Indian writer, journalist, biographer, social activist and environmentalist. He has authored more than 50 books and thousand articles both in Kannada and English. He is recipient of the "Karnataka State Sahitya Akademi Award" (1992) for year's best work in social science. In 2015, he was honoured by Hampi University, Karnataka with the 'Nadoja' award. An avid campaigner for environmental issues and people's rights, he has led numerous movements both at state and national level for conservation of vast tracts of rich flora and fauna from ill-planned Government policies. His years as a writer and chronicler brought him under the influence of doyens of literature and public life such as D. V. Gundappa, V. Sitaramayya, Rallapalli Ananta Krishna Sharma, Yadava Rao Joshi and P. Kodanda Rao. His writings essentially mirror the literary, cultural, nationalist and developmental problems that are contemporaneous to the present day scenario. S. R. Ramaswamy is currently the honorary Editor-in-Chief of Kannada monthly "Utthana" and "Rashrothana Sahitya" at Bangalore.

Early life

Ancestry
S. R. Ramaswamy was born to Mulukanadu Brahmin parents S. Ramachandra Sastri and Sarasvatamma on 29 October 1937 at Bangalore. He comes from a scholarly lineage and is the nephew of the historian and polyglot S. Srikanta Sastri as well as Asthan Vidwan Motaganahalli Subramanya Sastri who was editor of "Ranga Bhoomi" and is credited with "Karnata Malavikagnimitra" & translation of Valmiki's Ramayana from Sanskrit to Kannada. He is the great grand-nephew of Maha Asthan Vidwan Motaganahalli Ramshesha Sastri who was the first person to translate Bhagavata from original Sanskrit to Kannada and Asthan Vidwan Motaganahalli Shankara Sastri who is credited with the composition of "Vedanta Panchadarshi", a work extensively quoted by D. V. Gundappa. Ramaswamy's ancestor Yagnapathi Bhatta or Yagnam Bhatta was a court poet in the court of Immadi Kempegowda. Ramaswamy's older brother is the journalist S. R. Krishnamurthy.

Education
S. R. Ramaswamy had his preliminary schooling at Bangalore High School at Bangalore. He later on studied "Intermediate" course at The National College, Basavanagudi, Bangalore in the year 1953 – 54.

Career

Journalism
S. R. Ramaswamy began his career in journalism as an assistant editor at the William Quan Judge (W. Q. Judge) Press at Bangalore in the late 1950s. Following a brief interlude, he joined the Kannada weekly "Sudha" as the Chief Sub – Editor in 1972, a position he held until 1979. In 1980 he was made Honorary Editor – in – Chief at "Rashrothana Sahitya" and Kannada monthly "Utthana" at Bangalore, a position he continues to grace till date. S. R. Ramaswamy has been actively involved in delivering lectures at seminars and conferences across the country concerning a wide range of social, cultural and literary topics.

S. R. Ramaswamy continues to contribute actively to Kannada dailies such as "Prajavani" and "Kannada Prabha" among others. S. R. Ramaswamy is well versed in Sanskrit, Hindi, German, French, Kannada and Telugu – and has authored 55 books both in Kannada and English and about thousand articles, excluding numerous translations from various languages to Kannada. An excerpt from one of his earliest pieces – a review of noted French poet, essayist and philosopher – Ambroise Paul Toussaint Jules Valéry's "The Quintessentialised Intellectual" published in the 1972 PEN International Edition surmises his keen insight and in-depth knowledge of world literature:
 

S. R. Ramaswamy came to prominence when he authored an "Art Catalogue" on famous Russian painter Svetoslav Roerich chronicling his many paintings and exhibitions that the painter hosted in different countries across the world. The book has in it some rare photographs depicting the acclaimed Russian painter explaining and often showcasing his works to heads of states such as Nikita Khrushchev and Pandit Jawaharlal Nehru among others. Printed in limited numbers, the book is seldom found in libraries and is a collector's item today. Ramaswamy also came in contact with such eminent personalities as art critic Venkataram and internationally renowned Gandhian Economists Lakshmi Chand Jain and Sri Kumarappa.

Public life and Social Activism
S. R. Ramaswamy has been active in literature and journalism for over five decades and is a staunch advocate of the "Swadeshi movement" in India. Over the last few decades, Ramaswamy has spearheaded "Voluntary Rural Development Initiatives" in the Indian state of Karnataka with the aim of empowering the rural population for self-governance and better administration. He has been fighting for various environmental causes, both at state and national levels, often culminating in landmark legal battles before the Supreme Court of India. Most memorable of these was a Public Interest Litigation (PIL) he fought along with noted Kannada Litterateur Shivaram Karanth against Government of Karnataka concerning the conservation of nearly 30,000 hectares of reserve forest which was set aside to be handed over to a paper industry.

His association with noted composer, singer and writer Rallapalli Ananta Krishna Sharma enabled him to acquire proficiency in Carnatic as well as Hindustani classical music. His proficiency in the classical Indian dance form – Bharata Natyam was the result of his years of association with eminent dance maestro V. S. Kowshik.
 
Having remained a bachelor, S. R. Ramaswamy continues to remain active in public life. The "Gokhale Institute of Public Affairs" – an independent, non-party and non-communal organization established to function as a centre for education of the public towards a constructive democratic citizenship was founded in the year 1949 by noted Kannada writer and philosopher D. V. Gundappa. After D. V. Gundappa's tenure, the administration fell on the shoulders of retired Chief Justice of the Karnataka High Court – Nittoor Srinivasa Rau who subsequently bequeathed the administrative responsibilities to S. R. Ramaswamy who has ever since headed the organization in the position of Secretary. S. R. Ramaswamy has had the distinction of organizing four programmes a month over 12 months, almost a year in advance. 
 
S. R. Ramaswamy has consistently declined requests to visit foreign countries in connection with various conferences and seminars. In fact, he declined an invitation from the United Nations Office for a Global Environmental Summit at Rio de Janeiro in the 1990s citing personal reasons. However, Ramaswamy is actively involved in the Indian setting and has delivered papers at over 100 seminars & workshops on topics such as "Sharathchandra" (1977), "Towards Understanding Hindu Society" (1990), "Gandhian Concept of Ecology" (1992), "Netaji Subhas Chandra Bose" (1996), "The Regime of Sir Mirza Ismail" (1998), "Life and Work of V. Sitaramaiah", "Swadeshi movement of 1905: Historic Turning Point" (2005), "Saga of Patriotism: Martyrs in the Freedom Movement" (2007), "Contribution of Rallapalli Ananta Krishna Sharma to Kannada and Telugu" (2010), "Life and work of D. V. Gundappa" (2011), "Contribution of Sanskritist Professor S. K. Ramachandra Rao" (2013) and "Belagere Krishna Sastri" (2013).

Bibliography

Writing
S. R. Ramaswamy was fortunate in coming under the umbrella of such intellectual giants as D. V. Gundappa, V. Sitaramayya, Rallapalli Ananta Krishna Sharma, A. R. Krishnashastry, P. Kodanda Rao and Yadava Rao Joshi among others. His close association with D. V. Gundappa saw him putting to paper many of D. V. G.'s dictations; a task which he carried out with such meticulous dedication that D. V. Gundappa later reminisced about Ramaswamy in "Gnapaka Chitrashale" with great affection and gratitude. In fact, S. R. Ramaswamy played a pivotal role in compilation, editing and often proof-reading many of D. V. G's works – most notably "Jeevanadharmayoga" & "Bhagavadtatparya".

His first book "Mahabharatada Belavanige" (1972) attracted considerable attention from critics. His two volumes on Russian painter Svetoslav Roerich which came out as a collective in 1974 remains probably the only collected archive of the great painter's works and exhibitions around the world. His work "Shatamanada Tiruvinalli Bharata" (India at the turn of the century) (1989) won him the "Karnataka Sahitya Akademi Award" for best work written in Social Science in 1992. B. R. Ambedkar's biography co-authored with Chandrashekhar Bhandary titled "Samaja-Chikitsaka Ambedkar" published in 1990 attracted great attention and commendation for its truthfulness, accuracy and lack of bias. In fact, it has been widely translated into many Indian vernacular languages over the years. S. R. Ramaswamy's outspoken stand on the "Swadeshi" ideology was mirrored in two of his books published in 1994 titled "Swadeshi Jagruti" and "Swadeshi: Ondu Samvada" (Swadeshi: A Dialogue). His take on Globalisation and its impact on third world economies was well illustrated in his book published in 1995 titled "In The Woods of Globalisation". The successive year, 1996, he penned a biography of president of Indian National Congress and later the Indian National Army Subhas Chandra Bose titled "Kolminchu", which was received well by critics and readers alike. In the successive years, S. R. Ramaswamy brought out collections of brief biographical sketches of eminent personalities such as S. Srikanta Sastri, D. V. Gundappa, V. Sitaramayya, Rallapalli Ananta Krishna Sharma, Virakesari Sitarama Sastri, N. Chennakeshaiavaih, Yadavraj Joshi, P. Kodanda Rao, Ti. Ta. Sharma, Pt. Seshadri Gawai, M. H. Marigowda and V. S. Kowshik among others in two books titled "Deevitegegalu" and "Deeptimantaru" in 1998 and 2011. In addition to these, there are in excess of 20 various books of different Indian languages which have been translated to Kannada.

List of Books

 Ramaswamy, S. R. (1972) – Mahabharata Belavanige
 Ramaswamy, S. R. (1974) – Svetoslav Roerich (Ed.)
 Ramaswamy, S. R. (1976) – D. V. G. – a biography
 Ramaswamy, S. R. (1979) – Udaya Shankar – a biography
 Ramaswamy, S. R. (1980) – Sripad Damodar Satwalekar – a biography
 Ramaswamy, S. R. (1985) – Aravinda – Pt. Seshadri Gawai Felicitation Volume (Ed.)
 Ramaswamy, S. R. (1989) – Shatamanada Tiruvinalli Bharata
 Ramaswamy, S. R. (1990) – Samaja Chikitsaka Ambedkar
 Ramaswamy, S. R. (1992) – Bharatadalli Samajakarya – (Ed.)
 Ramaswamy, S. R. (1994) – Swadeshi Jagruti
 Ramaswamy, S. R. (1994) – Arthikatheya Eradu Dhruva
 Ramaswamy, S. R. (1994) – Swadeshi: Ondu Samvada 
 Ramaswamy, S. R. (1995) – In The Woods of Globalisation
 Ramaswamy, S. R. (1996) – Kolminchu
 Ramaswamy, S. R. (1997) – Swantantrodyayada Mailigallu
 Ramaswamy, S. R. (1998) – Deevatigegalu(pictured in photo)
 Ramaswamy, S. R. (1999) – Matantara: Ondu Samvada – co-authored with Chandrashekhara Bhandary  
 Ramaswamy, S. R. (1999) – Kargil Kampana

 Ramaswamy, S. R. (2000) – Sir Mokshagundam Visvesvaraya a biography
 Ramaswamy, S. R. (2000) – Sardar Vallabhai Patel a biography
 Ramaswamy, S. R. (2000) – Jayaprakash Narayan a biography
 Ramaswamy, S. R. (2001) – Magadi Lakshminarasimha Sastri a biography
 Ramaswamy, S. R. (2010) – Kelavu Itihasa Parvagalu
 Ramaswamy, S. R. (2009) – Nagarikathegala Sangharsha
 Ramaswamy, S. R. (2009) – Sahiti-Samarangana-Sarvabhouma Krishnadevaraya
 Ramaswamy, S. R. (2009) – Kautilyana Arthashastra 
 Ramaswamy, S. R. (2010) – Sookti Saptati
 Ramaswamy, S. R. (2011) – Deeptimantaru
 Ramaswamy, S. R. (2011) – Dhruvajala
 Ramaswamy, S. R. (2011) – Bharata Bhaskara Rabindranath Tagore
 Ramaswamy, S. R. (2012) – Yajurveda Belakinalli Jeevana Paripoornate
 Ramaswamy, S. R. (2013) – Navotthanada Pathadarshaka Swami Vivekananda
 Ramaswamy, S. R. (2014) – Kavalige
 Ramaswamy, S. R. (2019) – The Evolution of the Mahabharata and Other Writings on the Epic
 Ramaswamy, S. R. (2022) – Essays and Speeches (2 Volumes)

List of Translations

 Ramaswamy, S. R. (1975) – Patra Gucha – Nehru: A Bunch of Old Letters, (with K. S. Narasimha Swamy)
 Ramaswamy, S. R. (1981) – Dr Hedgewar: The Epochmaker,
 Ramaswamy, S. R. (1982) – Manobodha of Samarth Ramadas
 Ramaswamy, S. R. (1987) – Sangha – Gita from Sanskrit
 Ramaswamy, S. R. (1987) – Mahavedha by Chivukula Purushottam (from Telugu)
 Ramaswamy, S. R. (1989) – Bharata Jagruti by Dharma pal (from English)
 Ramaswamy, S. R. (1991) – Arya Akramana: Budavillada Vada by N. R. Waradpande (from English)
 Ramaswamy, S. R. (1992) – Top Writer by Panuganti (from Telugu)
 Ramaswamy, S. R. (1994) – I.C.C.U by Chittarvu Madhu (from Telugu)
 Ramaswamy, S. R. (1994) – Dunkel Akramakke Parihara: Swadeshi Jagruti
 Ramaswamy, S. R. (1996) – Bharatiya Chitta, Manasa, Kala by Dharmapal (from Hindi)
 Ramaswamy, S. R. (1996) – Kattiyalugina Setuve by Panuganti (from Telugu)
 Ramaswamy, S. R. (1997) – Sevapatha by Brajendrapal Singh (from Hindi)
 Ramaswamy, S. R. (1998) – Bye Bye Poloniya by Chittarvu Madhu (from Telugu)
 Ramaswamy, S. R. (2001) – Houde..? by Chittarvu Madhu (from Telugu)
 Ramaswamy, S. R. (2002) – Jedare Bale by Chittarvu Madhu (from Telugu)
 Ramaswamy, S. R. (2005) – Shilube Mattu Kodavaru by K. B. Ganapati (from English)
 Ramaswamy, S. R. (2007) – Anandamatha by Bankim Chandra (from Hindi)
 Ramaswamy, S. R. (2008) – Roopayigalu Baruttave, Jagruti! by Prabhakar Jaini (from Telugu)
 Ramaswamy, S. R. (2009) – Asidhara by Kasturi Muralikrishna (from Telugu)
 Ramaswamy, S. R. (2011) – Endu Yava Anubhandavo by Akumuri Muralikrishna (from Telugu)
 Ramaswamy, S. R. (2012) – Vishwaprayatna by Akumuri Muralikrishna (from Telugu)
 Ramaswamy, S. R. (2012) – Vanasuma
 Ramaswamy, S. R. (2013) – Target Number Two by G. Nageshwara Rao

List of Lectures

 Ramaswamy, S. R. (1972) – Vellala Kavi Parampare
 Ramaswamy, S. R. (1972) – S. Srikanta Sastrigala Bahumuka Parampare
 Ramaswamy, S. R. (1972) – Critique of Paul Valery
 Ramaswamy, S. R. (1975) – Copy – Editing
 Ramaswamy, S. R. (1977) – Sharathchandra
 Ramaswamy, S. R. (1983) – Life of Soliga Tribals
 Ramaswamy, S. R. (1984) – State of Land Reforms
 Ramaswamy, S. R. (1987) – Feature Writing & Development Journalism
 Ramaswamy, S. R. (1988) – Social Costs of Social Forestry
 Ramaswamy, S. R. (1990) – Towards Understanding Hindu Society 
 Ramaswamy, S. R. (1992) – Gandhian Concept of Ecology 
 Ramaswamy, S. R. (1993) – Alternative Life Vision: An Economic Perspective
 Ramaswamy, S. R. (1993) – Text – A Critical Study of the Mahabharata
 Ramaswamy, S. R. (1993) – Hindu Economics
 Ramaswamy, S. R. (1995) – Towards Humanistic Economies
 Ramaswamy, S. R. (1996) – United Nations in Retrospect
 Ramaswamy, S. R. (1996) – Netaji Subhas Chandra Bose
 Ramaswamy, S. R. (1998) – The Regime of Sir Mirza Ismail
 Ramaswamy, S. R. (1998) – The Concept of Development
 Ramaswamy, S. R. (1998) – Relevance of Swadeshi Movement
 Ramaswamy, S. R. (1998) – Life and Work of V. Sitaramaiah
 Ramaswamy, S. R. (2001) – A Decade of Globalisation
 Ramaswamy, S. R. (2002) – Intellectual Pollution
 Ramaswamy, S. R. (2003) – Journalism Today
 Ramaswamy, S. R. (2005) – Swadeshi Movement of 1905: Historic Turning Point
 Ramaswamy, S. R. (2007) – Saga of Patriotism: Martyrs in Freedom Movement
 Ramaswamy, S. R. (2007) – Foreign Friends of India's Freedom Movement
 Ramaswamy, S. R. (2010) – Contribution of Rallapalli Ananta Krishna Sharma
 Ramaswamy, S. R. (2011) – Life and Work of D. V. Gundappa
 Ramaswamy, S. R. (2013) – Contribution of Sanskritist Prof S. K. Ramachandra Rao
 Ramaswamy. S. R. (2013) – Belagere Krishna Sastri

Recognition
S. R. Ramaswamy's vast contribution to the world of journalism, literature, criticism and social activism have earned him many awards and accolades over the years. A few of these awards are listed here:
 
 "Canara Bank Award" First prize for article on "The Life of Soliga Tribals" (1983) 
 "Canara Bank Award" First prize for article on "State of Land Reforms" (1984)

 "Karnataka Sahitya Akademi Award" for "Shatamanada Tiruvinalli Bharata" (1989) as best work written in Social Science (1992)
 "Aryabhata Award" for Journalism (2006)
 "Karnataka Rajyotsava Prashasti" for Contribution to Literature (2008)
 "Mythic Society Centenary Award" for Scholastic Achievements (2009) 
 Honorary Doctorate 'D. Litt' from Karnataka State Open University for Lifetime Contribution to Literature & Journalism (2011) (pictured right)
 Karnataka Madhyama Academy "Person of the Year" Award for five decades of service to Journalism (2011)
 D. V. G Award – conferred by The D. V. G Balaga, Mysore
 "Nadoja" Award – Conferred by Hampi University, Karnataka (2015) (pictured left)

External links

 S. R. Ramaswamy – Biographical Memoir
 S. R. Ramaswamy | Official Webpage
Article in Vijayavani

References

Kannada-language writers
Activists from Karnataka
Living people
Swadeshi activists
20th-century Indian essayists
1937 births
Kannada people
Indian environmentalists
Writers from Bangalore
20th-century Indian biographers